Salto del Nilahue is a waterfall located in the commune of Lago Ranco in southern Chile. It lies in the lower flows of Nilahue River.

Waterfalls of Chile
Landforms of Los Ríos Region